This is a list of German states by Human Development Index (HDI) as of 2021.

Development 1995–2015 
Human Development Index of German states since 1995.

See also
List of countries by Human Development Index

References 

Germany, Human Development Index
Germany
Human Development Index
Human Development Index
Human Development Index